Asperdaphne walcotae is a species of sea snail, a marine gastropod mollusk in the family Raphitomidae.

Subspecies: Asperdaphne walcotae pallida Sowerby III, 1896

Description

Distribution
This marine species is endemic to Australia and occurs in the waters off the coast of South Australia.

References

 Sowerby, G.B. (3rd) 1893. Descriptions of fifteen new species of shells of the family Pleurotomidae. Proceedings of the Zoological Society of London 1893: 487–492
 Powell, A.W.B. 1966. The molluscan families Speightiidae and Turridae, an evaluation of the valid taxa, both Recent and fossil, with list of characteristic species. Bulletin of the Auckland Institute and Museum. Auckland, New Zealand 5: 1–184, pls 1–23

External links
 Verco, J.C. 1909. Notes on South Australian marine Mollusca with descriptions of new species. Part XII. Transactions of the Royal Society of South Australia 33: 293–342 
  Tucker, J.K. 2004 Catalog of recent and fossil turrids (Mollusca: Gastropoda). Zootaxa 682:1–1295
  Hedley, C. 1922. A revision of the Australian Turridae. Records of the Australian Museum 13(6): 213–359, pls 42-56 

walcotae
Gastropods of Australia
Gastropods described in 1893